Friday On My Mind is the first North American album from The Easybeats. The album was released as Good Friday in Europe, in the same month. This version omitted "Hound Dog" and replaced it with "Women" (re-titled "Make You Feel Alright (Women)") from the Australian It's 2 Easy album.

Like Good Friday, due to contract issues between United Artists Records and Albert Productions, the album was not released in the band's native Australia at the time. Friday On My Mind was later released in Australia in 1970 on the budget World Record Club label.  The Australian release featured new artwork, which was a drawing of the group as they appeared during the 1969 Australian tour (including drummer Tony Cahill, who wasn’t yet a member when the album was recorded).

A 1992 Repertoire CD release, under the same title and cover art as the North American album, has the track listing of the European Good Friday album.

Track listing
All songs written by Harry Vanda and George Young except as noted.

Side A

 "Friday On My Mind"
 "River Deep, Mountain High" (Jeff Barry, Ellie Greenwich, Phil Spector)		
 "Do You Have a Soul" - (edited to a shorter length than the UK version)		
 "Saturday Night"		
 "You Me, We Love"		
 "Pretty Girl"

Side B

 "Happy Is The Man"		
 "Make You Feel Alright (Women)" - (originally titled "Women" written by Stevie Wright, George Young)		
 "Who'll Be the One"		
 "Made My Bed Gonna Lie In It" (Young)		
 "Remember Sam"		
 "See Line Woman" (Traditional, arranged by Vanda, Young)

Personnel
The Easybeats
 Stevie Wright - vocals, percussion
 Harry Vanda - vocals, harmonies, guitars
 George Young - vocals, harmonies, guitars
 Dick Diamonde - vocals, bass
 Snowy Fleet - drums
Technical
 Producer: Shel Talmy except for "Make You Feel Alright (Women)" (produced by Ted Albert).

Charts

References

External links
[ allmusic - Friday on My Mind]
Information on Friday On My Mind single

The Easybeats albums
1967 albums
Albums produced by Shel Talmy
Albums recorded at IBC Studios
Albums recorded at Olympic Sound Studios